Hensel Phelps Construction Co. is one of the largest general contractors and construction managers in the United States, ranked consistently among ENR's (Engineering News-Record) top 20 Contractors by revenue. 
Founded in 1937 as a small, local builder in Greeley, Colorado, Hensel Phelps has grown into a multibillion-dollar, employee owned, national contractor with an eclectic portfolio of completed projects. Hensel Phelps currently has 11 different district offices located across the country, as well as additional regional offices.

In August 2021, Hensel Phelps announced its acquisition of the Colorado-based company Hydro Construction, which specializes in the construction of water and wastewater treatment facilities.

See also
 Top 100 US Federal Contractors

References

Employee-owned companies of the United States
Companies based in Greeley, Colorado
Construction and civil engineering companies established in 1937
Privately held companies based in Colorado
American companies established in 1937
Technology companies established in 1937
1937 establishments in Colorado